Isitha Wijesundera (born 11 May 1997) is a Sri Lankan cricketer. He made his List A debut on 15 December 2019, for Saracens Sports Club in the 2019–20 Invitation Limited Over Tournament. He made his Twenty20 debut on 5 March 2021, for Kandy Customs Cricket Club in the 2020–21 SLC Twenty20 Tournament.

References

External links
 

1997 births
Living people
Sri Lankan cricketers
Kandy Customs Sports Club cricketers
Saracens Sports Club cricketers
Place of birth missing (living people)